Philip Weiss is an American journalist who co-edits Mondoweiss ("a news website devoted to covering American foreign policy in the Middle East, chiefly from a progressive Jewish perspective") with journalist Adam Horowitz. Weiss describes himself as an anti-Zionist and rejects the label "post-Zionist."

Career
Weiss is the author of the novel Cock-a-doodle-doo (1996) and the non-fiction book American Taboo: A Murder In The Peace Corps (2004). He co-edited The Goldstone Report: The Legacy of the Landmark Investigation of the Gaza Conflict (2011) with Adam Horowitz and Lizzy Ratner.

Other Writing
Weiss has written for New York magazine, Harper's, Esquire, and The New York Observer.

In 2006 he began writing a daily blog called Mondoweiss for The New York Observer website which began to focus only on "Jewish issues" like "the Iraq disaster and my Jewishness, Zionism, neo-conservatism, Israel, Palestine." In the spring of 2007, he began Mondoweiss as an unaffiliated blog.

Books
 1996: Cock-a-doodle-doo
 2004: American Taboo: A Murder In The Peace Corps
 2011: The Goldstone Report: The Legacy of the Landmark Investigation of the Gaza Conflict, by Adam Horowitz, Lizzy Ratner, Philip Weiss, Naomi Klein, et al.

References

Further reading
 Adas, Jane. "From The Link's Links - http://www.mondoweiss.net," The Link, Vol. 43, Issue 1, Americans for Middle East Understanding, January - March 2010:12.
 PBS. "Extended Interviews: American Jews and Israel - Philip Weiss, writer and blogger," PBS, June 12, 2009.
 Philip Weiss: A Jewish Argument around the Arab Revolt at Radio Open Source
Masters of the Universe Go to Camp: Inside the Bohemian Grove Spy Magazine, November 1989, pages 59–76

External links
 

Living people
American online journalists
Jewish American writers
Jewish anti-Zionism in the United States
Year of birth missing (living people)
21st-century American Jews
Anti-Zionist Jews